Hoora a district of Manama, the capital of Bahrain.

Along with the Central Business District, Adliya, and Juffair, Hoora is considered one of Manama's nightlife centres, with many bars, hotels, restaurants, pubs and nightclubs (both Arabic and Western), and it is very popular among visitors from Saudi Arabia.

The Exhibitions Avenue is the most prominent location in Hoora. In the evenings, especially during weekends, this avenue becomes a very busy street with many tourists, locals, and foreigners.

The area contains several tourist attractions, including one of the world's premier collections of Islamic manuscripts and art, Beit Al Quran, and one of Bahrain's most important cultural spots, La Fontaine Contemporary Arts Centre.

Apart from bars and restaurants, the Exhibitions Avenue also houses many business establishments like Computer World, Arabian Printing & Publishing Company, Universal Palace, Gulf Computer Services, "Zainal Mart", "Nesto Supermarket", "Noora Restaurant", Genius Computer" Etc.

The GOSI Complex is a shopping complex that is also located on Exhibitions Avenue. The Abu Bakr Siddeeq mosque is a landmark on Exhibitions Avenue and is located beside the Hoora Police Station. Much of the architecture of Hoora is in the traditional Gulf style and dates back to the beginning of the 20th century.

See also 
 List of tourist attractions in Bahrain
 Culture of Bahrain

References 

Neighborhoods of Manama
Tourist attractions in Manama
Populated coastal places in Bahrain
Art gallery districts